Raajtilak (2019) is an  Indian, Bhojpuri language action, romance and drama film directed by Rajnish Mishra and produced by Pradeep K Sharma and co-produced by Anita Sharma and Padam Singh, Under the Banner of "Baba Motion Pictures Pvt" Ltd. It stars Arvind Akela Kallu, Sonalika Prasad in the lead roles, while Awdhesh Mishra, Sushil Singh, Sanjay Pandey, Padam Singh, Dev Singh Anita Rawat, Rashmi Sharma, Jyoti Pandey, Naveen Sharma, Anand Mohan Pandey, Rohit Singh 'Matru', Subodh Seth, Pappu Yadav, Arun Singh 'Kaka', Sanjeev Jha and others play supporting roles.

Cast

Arvind Akela Kallu
Awdhesh Mishra
Sonalika Prasad
Sushil Singh
Sanjay Pandey
Padam Singh
Anita Rawat
Jyoti Pandey
Dev Singh
Naveen Sharma
Anand Mohan Pandey
Rohit Singh 'Matru'
Rashmi Sharma
Subodh Seth
Pappu Yadav
Arun Singh 'Kaka'
Sanjeev Jha

Music
The music of Raajtilak is composed by Rajnish Mishra with lyrics penned by Rajnish Mishra, Praful Tiwari, Santosh Utpati and Om Albela. It is produced under the Yashi Films music company.

First song of this movie Hamra Se Dhair Angreji was released on 29 March 2019 at YouTube official handel of "Yashi Films". It trended on YouTube.

Marketing
First look romantic poster of this movie was released on 7 February 2019 The trailer of this movie was released on 2 February 2019 at official YouTube channel of Yashi Films, who also bought his satellite rights. Trailer has cross over 1.2 million views on YouTube until now. Movie digital promotion done by "BFilms Digital Media".

The film was released on 12 July 2019 in Uttar Pradesh, Bihar, Jharkhand and Mumbai.

References

2019 films
2010s Bhojpuri-language films